The Foster Hewitt Memorial Award is an annual accolade honoring a member of the ice hockey broadcasting world. It was named for the Canadian hockey radio broadcaster and newspaper journalist Foster Hewitt, and it has been presented every year at a media luncheon ceremony that occurs late in the year at the Hockey Hall of Fame in BCE Place, Toronto, Ontario, Canada since 1984. The winner is chosen by a committee of members composed of radio and television figures that make up the NHL Broadcasters' Association. It is given "to recognize distinguished members of the radio and television industry who made outstanding contributions to their profession and the game during their career in hockey broadcasting." Each recipient receives a glass plaque, which is put on display in the Hall of Fame's media section. The ceremony associated with the award is staged separately to the induction of players into the Hockey Hall of Fame because media honorees are not considered full inductees.

The first four winners were Fred Cusick, Foster Hewitt, Danny Gallivan and René Lecavalier in 1984. The award was given out twice in two further consecutive years to both Budd Lynch and Doug Smith in 1985 and Wes McKnight and Lloyd Pettit the following year. It has presented posthumously on four occasions, to Smith in 1985, McKnight the following year, Dan Kelly in 1989 and Bill Hewitt in 2007. Dave Strader was named the recipient in April 2017 but he died of a rare form of bile duct cancer called cholangiocarcinoma on October 1, 2017 before the ceremony to commemorate his career that was held the following month. His three children accepted the award on his behalf. It has been presented to broadcasters who have been affiliated with the CBC Television sports program Hockey Night in Canada seven times, followed by the Montreal Canadiens and the Toronto Maple Leafs on six occasions. The 2020 winner was the Hartford Whalers and Tampa Bay Lightning broadcaster Rick Peckham.

Inductees

Statistics

See also
 Ford C. Frick Award
 Pete Rozelle Radio-Television Award

References

External links
 

Awards established in 1982

Ice hockey trophies and awards

Sportscasting awards
1982 establishments in Canada